Electronic Video Recording, or EVR, was a film-based video recording format developed by Hungarian-born engineer Peter Carl Goldmark at CBS Laboratories in the 1960s.

CBS announced the development of EVR on August 27, 1967.    The 750-foot film was stored on a  spool in a plastic cartridge. It used a twin-track 8.75 mm film onto which video signals were transferred by electron beam recording, two monochrome tracks in the same direction of travel.

Some EVR films had a separate chroma track in place of the second program monochrome track for color EVR films.  The images stored on an EVR film were visible frames much like motion picture film, and were read by a flying-spot scanner inside an EVR player to be converted to a video signal to be sent to a television set.
 
EVR was also released by CBS as a professional version for television broadcasting, called BEVR (Broadcast EVR).  As a professional medium, the format offered extremely high quality.  It was, however, quickly superseded by professional and consumer magnetic tape formats.

Applications
In 1975, Nintendo's EVR Race was a racing-themed arcade game that used EVR technology to play back video footage of pre-recorded races from a video tape. EVR Race was Japan's highest-grossing medal game for three years in a row, from 1976 to 1978.

References

External links
The quest for home video: EVR
LabGuy's World page on EVR
CBS, Photos of EVR
EVR page on Total Rewind - the Virtual Museum of Vintage VCRs
Demonstration film of EVR (circa 1969) on youtube.com

Audiovisual introductions in 1967
Discontinued media formats
Video storage